Events during the year 1979 in Northern Ireland.

Incumbents
Secretary of State - Roy Mason (until 5 May), Humphrey Atkins (from 5 May)

Events

January to March
5 January - Two members of the Provisional Irish Republican Army (IRA) are killed in Ardoyne, Belfast, when the car bomb they are transporting explodes prematurely.
4 February - A former prison officer and his wife are shot dead at their home in Oldpark Road, Belfast, by the IRA.
20 February - Eleven Loyalists, known as the Shankill Butchers, are sentenced to life imprisonment for 112 offences, including nineteen sectarian murders.
24 February - Two Catholic teenagers, mistaken in the dark for a British Army foot patrol, are killed by the IRA in a remote-controlled bomb explosion at Darkley, County Armagh.
16 March - The Bennett Report, investigating allegations of ill treatment of people held in interrogation centres in Northern Ireland, is published and Government undertakes to implement major recommendations.
22 March - The IRA kills Richard Sykes, British Ambassador to the Netherlands, and his Dutch valet, in a gun attack in The Hague, Netherlands.
22 March - The IRA carries out a series of attacks across Northern Ireland with 24 bomb explosions.
30 March - Airey Neave, Conservative Party Spokesman on Northern Ireland, is killed by an Irish National Liberation Army (INLA) booby-trap bomb attached to his car at the House of Commons, London.

April to June
5 April - Two British Army soldiers are shot dead by the IRA while standing outside Andersonstown joint Royal Ulster Constabulary (RUC) and British Army base in Belfast.
11 April - Two British Army soldiers die as the result of a gun attack carried out by the IRA in Ballymurphy, Belfast.
16 April - A prison officer is shot dead by the IRA as he leaves a church in Clogher, County Tyrone, where his sister had just been married.
17 April - Four RUC officers are killed when the IRA explodes a 1,000-pound van bomb at Bessbrook, County Armagh.
19 April - A female prison officer is shot dead and three colleagues are injured in an IRA gun and grenade attack outside Armagh women's prison.
19 April - A British Army school cadet officer is shot dead by an IRA sniper in Belfast.
7 June - European Parliament election, the first direct election to the European Parliament. The Democratic Unionist Party, Social Democratic and Labour Party and Official Ulster Unionist Party each gain an MEP.

July to September
14 July - In Crossmaglen, County Armagh, Gaelic Athletic Association supporters parade silently in protest against the British Army's commandeering of part of the local football pitch.
27 August - In the Warrenpoint ambush the IRA kill eighteen British soldiers in two bomb explosions.
11 September - BBC Radio Foyle begins broadcasting.
29 September - Pope John Paul II, in Drogheda at the start of a 3-day visit to Ireland, appeals for an end to violence in Northern Ireland. Plans for him to extend his visit to Northern Ireland have been abandoned.

Sport

Football
Irish League
Winners: Linfield

Irish Cup
Winners: Cliftonville 3 - 2 Portadown

Motorcycling
Robert Dunlop makes his road race debut at the Temple 100.

Births

January to June
11 January - Michael Duff, footballer.
27 February - Neil Anderson, cricketer.
3 April - Neil Best, rugby player.
15 May - Sean Friars, footballer.
18 May - Richard McKinney, footballer.
25 May - Andy Kirk, footballer.
28 May - Michael Halliday, footballer.
19 June - John Duddy, boxer.
20 June - Stuart Robinson, radio DJ.
30 June - Darren Kelly, footballer.

July to December
30 July - Graeme McDowell, golfer.
3 August - Paul McCloskey, boxer.
5 August - Richard Graham, footballer.
5 August - David Healy, footballer.
8 November - Aaron Hughes, international footballer.
24 November - Aidan O'Kane, footballer.
5 December - Gareth McAuley, footballer.
31 December - Emma Little-Pengelly, Democratic Unionist Party MP.

Deaths
4 June - James Hamilton, 4th Duke of Abercorn, soldier and politician (born 1904).
10 August - Joseph O'Doherty, Sinn Féin MP, Fianna Fáil TD and Seanad member (born 1891).
15 November - Patrick McGilligan, Cumann na nGaedheal/Fine Gael TD and Cabinet Minister (born 1889).
17 December - Harold Jackson, cricketer (born 1888).

Full date unknown
Billy McCracken, footballer and football manager (born 1883).

See also
1979 in Scotland
1979 in Wales

References

 
Northern Ireland